Karz is a 1980 Indian Hindi-language romantic thriller film directed by Subhash Ghai, starring Rishi Kapoor and Tina Munim as leads, also starring Simi Garewal, in the critically acclaimed role of Kamini Verma, the murderous wife from the past life, which won her a Filmfare nomination. The film's music was by Laxmikant–Pyarelal, giving successful numbers like Om Shanti Om and Dard-E-Dil, and they went on to win Filmfare Best Music Director Award for this film, the lyricist received two Filmfare nominations for these two hits.

Plot 

The movie begins with Ravi Verma winning a legal battle against Sir Judah who had unjustly usurped Ravi's father's wealth and property after his death. Ravi calls his mother to tell her the good news and that he is marrying his girlfriend Kamini, who unbeknownst to him is a gold-digger working for Judah. On their way home to Coonoor, Kamini rams Ravi over a cliff near a small temple of the Goddess Kali. Distraught at the sudden death of her son, Ravi's mother demands the Goddess allow her son to pay his mother's debt for dying prematurely, while Kamini inherits everything. Two decades later, Monty, an orphan raised by G.G. Oberoi, is a twenty-one-year-old singer who starts to have visions of Ravi's memories triggered by a tune that Ravi used to like.

Monty's doctors joke that maybe he is Ravi's reincarnation, but in all seriousness should just take a vacation and rest. Monty travels to Ooty (coincidentally near Coonoor) where Tina lives and they fall in love. Tina tells him that she was brought up by a woman she calls Rani Sahiba and her uncle Kabira who, having served 10 years for murder, is released from jail. As Monty explores the area and learns the Verma Family story from the locals, including that Ravi's mother and his sister were ousted from their house by Kamini, he starts to experience more of Ravi's memories which become more intense. He is later shocked to find that Tina's Rani Sahiba and Kamini are one and the same.

Kabira then reveals to Monty that Tina's father was murdered by Kamini's brother after overhearing a secret involving Ravi and the temple of Kali. In retaliation, Kabira killed Kamini's brother which is why he went to jail. Pretending to know Kamini's secret, Kabira blackmailed her to raise Tina with a proper education. Monty in kind reveals to Kabira his connection to Ravi Verma, and that they must find Ravi's estranged family, with whom Monty is united. Accepting that he is Ravi's reincarnation, Monty is able to piece together Ravi's murder.

To set things right, Monty and Kabira gradually trick Kamini into believing that Ravi's ghost seeks revenge. In their final trick, Monty and Tina perform at a local school opening function attended by Kamini, where they dramatize Ravi's story.

Kamini is horrified to see Ravi's mother and sister, and flees. When Monty confronts her, Kamini confesses to Ravi's murder, which the police record. However, Judah holds Tina hostage and offers her in exchange for Kamini. Just as the exchange is about to take place, Tina jumps on Kamini causing a mêlée. Kabira and Monty gain the upper hand but Judah locks Ravi's mother and sister in a house and sets it ablaze. Monty saves them, and kills Judah in the fire. Kamini escapes in a jeep but Monty pursues her. She tries to ram Monty off the cliff at the temple of Kali in the same way she killed Ravi, but this time Monty jumps away, causing her to drive off the cliff to her death. In the end, the Verma wealth and property is returned to Ravi's family and Monty marries Tina.

Cast

Crew
Direction – Subhash Ghai
Screenplay – Sachin Bhowmick
Dialogue – Dr. Rahi Masoom Reza
Production – Akhtar Farooqui, Jagjit Khurana
Editing – Waman Bhonsle, Gurudutt Shirali
Cinematography – Kamalakar Rao
Direction Assistant – Ashok Ghai, Kuku Khanna
Art Direction – Sudhendu Roy
Costume Design – Bhanu Athaiya, Bhavana Munim, Satyawan
Choreography – Suresh Bhatt
Music Direction – Laxmikant–Pyarelal. Karz Theme by Gorakh Sharma
Lyrics – Anand Bakshi
Playback – Mohammed Rafi, Asha Bhosle, Kishore Kumar, Lata Mangeshkar, Manna Dey, Anuradha Paudwal

Soundtrack 

The soundtrack of the film includes tracks composed by Laxmikant-Pyarelal, with lyrics by Anand Bakshi, who received two Filmfare nominations for these two hits, "Om Shanti Om" and "Dard-E-Dil", Laxmikant-Pyarelal however, won the trophy for Best Music Director of the year. With hits like, "Ek Haseena Thi" and "Om Shanti Om" by Kishore Kumar and "Dard-E-Dil" by Mohammed Rafi, the soundtrack was a trendsetter for disco music in the Indian music industry and film's background score, especially the signature tune are still remembered as one of the most memorable ones. The title track "Om Shanti Om" is inspired by the Lord Shorty calypso song of the same name, while the dramatic "Ek Hasina Thi" resembles George Benson's "We As Love".

The film's chart-buster song, Om Shanti Om, sung by Kishore Kumar, reached the number 2 spot on Binaca Geetmala's annual list 1980, while another duet between Lata and Kishore, Tu Kitne Baras Ki reached number 13.

Reception

Despite being counted as a cult classic today, Karz was declared an "average" nationwide during its opening and very next week Feroz Khan's mega budget Qurbani was released and crashed it at the box office. Rishi Kapoor admitted himself about its failure in his many interviews and also in his biography. In a 2008 interview, film director, Subhash Ghai admitted that film was ahead of its time, and was thus panned by critics of the times, and "flopped" at the box office, it was only years later that it started being considered a classic and even remade several times over.

The film is also one of the finest films of Subhash Ghai, notable for picturisation of songs like Ek Hasina Thi on stage as well as Dard-E-Dil, and set the standard for his future films, as most of them became known for his dramatic flair, and above all their music score.

Influence and legacy

Though the theme of reincarnation was earlier handled in Madhumati (1958), Kudrat (1981), and Mehbooba (1976), the modern twist with the murder and revenge angle in Karz was a contemporary pot-boiler. Film critic Anupama Chopra also cites The Reincarnation of Peter Proud (1975, J. Lee Thompson), an adaptation of a novel of the same name by Max Ehrlich, as the basis of the film. Director Subhash Ghai admitted that Karz was partly inspired by the 1975 film but was mixed in with Indian beliefs on reincarnation.

Karz went on to inspire several other Indian remakes, notably Yuga Purusha (1989) in Kannada; Enakkul Oruvan (1984) in Tamil; Aatmabalam (1985) in Telugu; and the Hindi film Karzzzz (2008), starring Himesh Reshammiya.  Karz may have also inspired the American film Chances Are (1989).

The songs of the film inspired several film titles, notably Dard-e-dil (1983), Paisa Yeh Paisa (1985), Main Solah Baras Ki (1998), Ek Hasina Thi (2004), Aashiq Banaya Aapne (2005) and Om Shanti Om (2007), which was seen as a light-hearted tribute to the film, as it borrowed many elements from it.

Awards

 28th Filmfare Awards:

Won

 Best Music Director – Laxmikant–Pyarelal

Nominated

 Best Supporting Actress – Simi Garewal
 Best Lyricist – Anand Bakshi for "Dard-E-Dil"
 Best Lyricist – Anand Bakshi for "Om Shanti Om"
 Best Male Playback Singer – Kishore Kumar for "Om Shanti Om"
 Best Male Playback Singer – Mohammed Rafi for "Dard-E-Dil"

References

External links 

 
 Karz at Indian Cinema. Philip Lutgendorf, University of Iowa.

1980s Hindi-language films
1980s thriller drama films
1980 films
Films about reincarnation
Indian supernatural thriller films
Films scored by Laxmikant–Pyarelal
Films directed by Subhash Ghai
Films shot in Ooty
Indian films about revenge
Hindi films remade in other languages
1980 drama films
Films based on American novels
Indian remakes of American films
Indian mystery thriller films
Indian mystery drama films